Salonius (c. 400 – 28 September 475) known as Salonius of Geneva was a confessor and bishop of the 5th century, A son of Eucherius of Lyon and Galla. He was educated at Lérins Abbey, first by Hilary of Arles, then by Salvianus and Vincent of Lérins. In 440, he was elected bishop of Geneva and, as such, took part in the Synod of Orange (441), the Synod of Vaison (442), and the Synod of Arles (451). He has also been listed as the bishop of Genoa, but it is not clear if this was a later appointment or if the word Geneva was miswritten as Genova. He was an accomplished Latin ecclesiastical writer. Most notably, he composed mystical and allegorical interpretations of the Proverbs and Ecclesiastes. His feast day is 28 September.

References
 Holweck, F. G., A Biographical Dictionary of the Saints. 1924.

External links
Opera Omnia by Migne Patrologia Latina with analytical indexes

French Roman Catholic saints
5th-century Christian saints
Gallo-Roman saints
400 births
5th-century deaths
5th-century bishops in the Roman Empire
5th-century Latin writers